303 Squadron or 303rd Squadron may refer to:

No. 303 Squadron RAF
303 Squadron RNLAF
303d Fighter Squadron (World War II), United States Air Forces
303d Troop Carrier Squadron, a World War II United States Air Forces unit
303rd Fighter Squadron, United States Air Force
303rd Intelligence Squadron, United States Air Force
303rd Expeditionary Rescue Squadron, United States Air Force

See also
 Squadron 303 (book), about the RAF unit
 Hurricane: 303 Squadron, film about the RAF unit